Claude Victor de Boissieu (28 November 1784 – 23 November 1868) was a French artist and local politician.

Boissieu was born in Ambérieu-en-Bugey, Ain.  He first studied art under his uncle, the engraver Jean-Jacques de Boissieu (1736-1810). After working at court during the restoration of the monarchy after 1815, de Boissieu served as Mayor of Ambérieu-en-Bugey, Justice of the Peace, and Councillor for Ain.

Works 
Flora of Europe (Published between 1804 and 1823 by Bruyset, Lyon). 
Second picturesque journey through parts of Bugey, Savoy and Switzerland in July–August 1811 
Diverse other works including Portrait Of My Uncle Lieutenant Camille-Marie de Valous; The Door To The Park (1806).

Sources 
 Bénézit Dictionary of Artists, Ed. Gründ.
 Dictionary of French Biography

1784 births
1868 deaths
People from Ambérieu-en-Bugey
19th-century French painters
French male painters
19th-century French male artists